Laghman can refer to:
 Laghman Province in Afghanistan
 Laghman, Jowzjan, a place in Jowzjan Province, Afghanistan
 Laghman (food), a noodle dish

See also
 Aramaic Inscription of Laghman, Afghanistan
 Laghmani, a surname